What the Health is a 2017 documentary film which critiques the health impact of meat, fish, eggs and dairy products consumption, and questions the practices of leading health and pharmaceutical organizations. The film also advocates for a plant-based diet.

The documentary has been criticized by a number of medical doctors, dietitians, and investigative journalists for what they describe as confusing causation with correlation, cherry picking science studies, biased sources, distortion of study findings, and using "weak-to-non-existent data".

Synopsis 
Advertised as "The Health Film That Health Organizations Don't Want You To See", the film follows Kip Andersen as he interviews physicians and other individuals on diet and health topics. Andersen is also shown attempting to contact representatives of various health organizations, but comes away dissatisfied with their responses. Through other interviews he examines the alleged connection between the meat, dairy, and pharmaceutical industries, as well as various health organizations. The synopsis is that serious health problems are a consequence of consuming meat and dairy products, and that a conspiracy exists to cover this up.

Production 
What the Health was written, produced, and directed by Kip Andersen and Keegan Kuhn, the same production team behind the documentary Cowspiracy. It was executive-produced by Joaquin Phoenix, a long-time vegan.
 
What the Health was funded via an Indiegogo campaign in March 2016, raising more than $235,000. The film was released globally on Vimeo on March 16, 2017, and screenings licensed through Tugg Inc.

Featured individuals 
The following doctors were featured in the film:
 Milton Mills (physician, plant-based advocate, author)
 Garth Davis (bariatric surgeon, plant-based advocate, author)
 Michael Greger (physician, veganism advocate, author)
 Michael Klaper (physician, veganism advocate, author)
 Neal Barnard (clinical researcher, author, founder of vegan-advocacy group Physicians Committee for Responsible Medicine)
 Caldwell Esselstyn (physician, veganism advocate, author)
 Kim A. Williams (cardiologist, President of the American College of Cardiology)
 John McDougall (physician, vegetarian food company owner, author)
A number of non-physicians were also interviewed:
 Michele Simon (public health lawyer, author)
 Steve-O (comedian, actor in Jackass)
 Ryan Shapiro (historian of national security, MIT)
 David Carter (former NFL defensive lineman)
 Timothy Shieff (world champion freerunner, Ninja Warrior)
 Tia Blanco (professional surfer, double ISA World Surfing champion)
 Susan M. Levin (dietitian, Director of Nutrition Education for the Physicians Committee for Responsible Medicine)

Criticism 
The documentary has drawn criticism from many, including medical doctors and scientific skeptics, who contend that it misrepresents facts:
 On July 3, 2017, Zubin Damania, a medical doctor and founder of Turntable Health, used his ZDoggMD persona to review What the Health on his YouTube channel. Damania agreed with the documentary's assertion that a diet heavy in processed food was associated with negative health effects and that the Food and Drug Administration sometimes offered "stupid nutrition recommendations" that recommends a uniform solution for everyone. However, he also commented in detail on what he characterized as frequent confirmation bias and cherry-picking of selected data, as well as the oversimplification of complex health issues and rampant misinformation which he observed in the documentary. He also highlighted what he saw as the ridiculous claim made of "institutionalized racism" on the part of the dairy industry. Damania concluded in exasperation: "that was the stupidest [expletive] thing I've ever seen... I feel like I've lost [expletive] brain cells". Joel Kahn, a cardiologist featured in the film, responded to ZDoggMD's video via a Medium article proposing some of Damania's criticism seemed unaware of research cited in the film.
 On July 11, 2017, Harriet Hall, a medical doctor and scientific skeptic known as the SkepDoc, reviewed the documentary on Science-Based Medicine. Hall wrote that "What the Health espouses the fairy tale that all major diseases... can be prevented and cured by eliminating meat and dairy from the diet. It is a blatant polemic for veganism, biased and misleading, and is not a reliable source of scientific information." At the end of her article, she agrees there are health benefits associated with increased plant consumption, but also notes "the evidence is insufficient to recommend that everyone adopt a vegan diet" and "we needn't entirely reject all animal foods". Finally, she recommends moderation in all things.
 On July 20, 2017, Martijn Katan, emeritus professor in nutrition from Vrije Universiteit Amsterdam, called the film "propaganda". Katan says What the Health? exaggerates the health risks of meat, eggs and dairy, and dangerously claims veganism prevents or cures many diseases, like cancer or diabetes. However, he stressed lowered average meat consumption would offer health benefits, and also noted veganism can be a healthy lifestyle for all but young children if care is taken to obtain nutrients. Katan also agreed veganism is in many ways good for the environment.
 Sarah Berry, Lifestyle Health Editor for The Sydney Morning Herald, commented: "What the Health does make some valid points including concerns about the influence of Big Food on dietary recommendations and about poor farming practices, which can be both inhumane and bad for the planet". However, Berry also wrote: "The makers cherry-pick science, use biased sources, distort study findings and use 'weak-to-non-existent data ...'" Berry quoted Dr. Joanna McMillan as saying that "To me it's the usual product of those who are filmmakers and not nutrition scientists or trained in any aspect of medicine or science, therefore not trained or qualified to make sense of scientific research."
 On August 8, 2017, Chase Purdy in Quartz declared: "By cherry-picking nutrition studies to make rickety claims, the makers of What the Health risk ratcheting up fear of certain foods based on weak science. It's not a responsible way to try and change people's behavior, and it does a disservice to nutritional scientists in the field."

Awards 
 2018 Cinema for Peace Award Nominee, Most Valuable Documentary of the Year

Book 
A companion book of the same name was released in February 2017, authored by Eunice Wong.

See also 
 List of vegan media
 Veganism
 Forks Over Knives

References

External links 

 
 
 

2017 documentary films
2017 films
American documentary films
2010s English-language films
2010s American films
Documentary films about plant-food diets